Ninoslav Radovanović (born 6 May 1940) is a Serbian cardiac surgeon. He was born in Niš and graduated from the University of Belgrade School of Medicine. He is a member of the Serbian Academy of Sciences and Arts.

References

Sources

1940 births
Living people
Serbian cardiac surgeons